|}
{| class="collapsible collapsed" cellpadding="0" cellspacing="0" style="clear:right; float:right; text-align:center; font-weight:bold;" width="280px"
! colspan="3" style="border:1px solid black; background-color: #77DD77;" | Also Ran

The 2001 Epsom Derby was a horse race which took place at Epsom Downs on Saturday 9 June 2001. It was the 222nd running of the Derby, and it was won by the pre-race joint favourite Galileo. The winner was ridden by Michael Kinane and trained by Aidan O'Brien. The other joint favourite Golan finished second.

Race details
 Sponsor: Vodafone
 Winner's prize money: £580,000
 Going: Good to Firm
 Number of runners: 12
 Winner's time: 2m 33.27s

Full result

* The distances between the horses are shown in lengths or shorter. nk = neck.† Trainers are based in Great Britain unless indicated.

Winner's details
Further details of the winner, Galileo:

 Foaled: 30 March 1998 in Ireland
 Sire: Sadler's Wells; Dam: Urban Sea (Miswaki)
 Owner: Sue Magnier and Michael Tabor
 Breeder: David Tsui and Orpendale
 Rating in 2001 International Classifications: 129

Form analysis

Two-year-old races
Notable runs by the future Derby participants as two-year-olds in 2000.

 Tobougg – 1st Prix de la Salamandre, 1st Dewhurst Stakes
 Storming Home – 2nd Solario Stakes, 9th Somerville Tattersall Stakes
 Perfect Sunday – 2nd Washington Singer Stakes
 Dilshaan – 1st Racing Post Trophy
 King Carew – 5th Autumn Stakes
 Cashel Bay – 16th Eyrefield Stakes

The road to Epsom
Early-season appearances in 2001 and trial races prior to running in the Derby.

 Galileo – 1st Ballysax Stakes, 1st Derrinstown Stud Derby Trial
 Golan – 1st 2,000 Guineas
 Tobougg – 9th 2,000 Guineas
 Mr Combustible – 1st Chester Vase
 Storming Home – 1st Blue Riband Trial Stakes, 3rd Dante Stakes
 Perfect Sunday – 1st Lingfield Derby Trial
 Dilshaan – 1st Dante Stakes
 Putra Sandhurst – 2nd Lingfield Derby Trial
 Sunny Glenn – 2nd Feilden Stakes, 6th Lingfield Derby Trial
 Chancellor – 1st Sandown Classic Trial
 Cashel Bay – 5th Leopardstown 2,000 Guineas Trial Stakes, 4th Amethyst Stakes, 6th Saval Beg Stakes, 12th Irish 2,000 Guineas

Subsequent Group 1 wins
Group 1 / Grade I victories after running in the Derby.

 Galileo – Irish Derby (2001), King George VI and Queen Elizabeth Stakes (2001)
 Golan – King George VI and Queen Elizabeth Stakes (2002)
 Storming Home – Champion Stakes (2002), Clement L. Hirsch Memorial Turf Championship (2003)

Subsequent breeding careers
Leading progeny of participants in the 2001 Epsom Derby.

Sires of Classic winners
<div style="font-size:85%">
Galileo (1st) - Eleven time leading sire in Great Britain and Ireland and sire of 40 individual classic winners as of June 2020
 Frankel - 1st 2000 Guineas Stakes (2011), European Champion Two-Year-Old, Three-Year Old and Older Horse
 Australia - 1st Epsom Derby, 1st Irish Derby (2014)
 Waldgeist - 1st Prix de l'Arc de Triomphe (2019) 
 Rip Van Winkle - 1st Sussex Stakes (2009), 1st Queen Elizabeth II Stakes (2009), 1st International Stakes (2010)
 Nightime - 1st Irish 1000 Guineas (2006) - Dam of Ghaiyyath (1st Coronation Cup 2020)
</div>

Sires of Group/Grade One winners
Golan (2nd)
 Beauty Flash - 1st Hong Kong Mile (2010), 1st Hong Kong Stewards' Cup (2011), 1st Queen's Silver Jubilee Cup (2011)
 Kibbutz - 1st Victoria Derby (2007)
 Missunited - 1st Galway Hurdle (2013), 2nd Ascot Gold Cup (2014)
 Golan Way - 1st Sharp Novices' Hurdle
Tobougg (3rd)
 The Pooka - 1st New Zealand 2000 Guineas (2007)
 Penny's Gift - 1st German 1,000 Guineas (2009)
 Screen Star - Dam of Lumiere (1st Cheveley Park Stakes 2015) and Sheikha Reika (1st E. P. Taylor Stakes 2018)
 Bouggler - 1st Mersey Novices' Hurdle (2009)
Storming Home (5th)
 Lion Tamer - 1st Victoria Derby (2010)
 Jakkalberry - 1st Gran Premio di Milano (2010)
 Flying Cloud - 2nd Pretty Polly Stakes (2010)
 Tempestatefloresco - 1st Summer Cup (2017)

Sires of National Hunt horses
Mr Combustible (4th)
 Goulanes - 1st Towton Novices' Chase (2013)
 Same Difference - 1st Fulke Walwyn Kim Muir Challenge Cup (2013)
 Busty Brown - 1st Monksfield Novice Hurdle (2012)
 Mackeys Forge - 2nd Festival Novice Hurdle (2011)

Other Stallions
Dilshaan (7th) - Damsire of Va Bank (3rd Bayerisches Zuchtrennen 2018)Putra Sandhurst (8th) - Sired minor jumps winner

References
 
 sportinglife.com
 

External links
 Colour Chart – Derby 2001''

Epsom Derby
 2001
Epsom Derby
Epsom Derby
2000s in Surrey